Irina Vasylyuk is a Ukrainian football defender. On 10 December 2018 Vasylyuk on her page at facebook announced about retiring from national team.

She previously played for several sides in the Ukrainian League including Metalist Kharkiv with whom she played the 2004-05 UEFA Women's Cup, Energiya Voronezh in Russia and Medyk Konin in the Polish Ekstraliga.

She has been a member of the Ukraine national team since 2004, and took part in the 2009 European Championship. Vasylyuk made her debut on 28 April 2004 in an away loss to Germany 0:6. Upon retiring in 2018 she capped with 63 games.

References

1985 births
Living people
Ukrainian women's footballers
WFC Kyivska Rus Kyiv players
WFC Metalist Kharkiv players
WFC Mariupolchanka Mariupol players
WFC Zhytlobud-2 Kharkiv players
Expatriate women's footballers in Russia
Expatriate women's footballers in Poland
FC Energy Voronezh players
Medyk Konin players
Ukraine women's international footballers
Women's association football defenders
Place of birth missing (living people)
Ukrainian expatriate sportspeople in Russia
Ukrainian expatriate sportspeople in Poland